Onkarlal Berwa (1916-1996) was an Indian politician. He was elected to the Lok Sabha, the lower house of the Parliament of India from Kota, Rajasthan as a member of the Bharatiya Jana Sangh.

Shri Bairwa died in 1996. Every year his death anniversary is observed in Kota.

After his death, his grandson Suresh Bairwa joined the Bhartiya Janta Party.

References

External links
 Official biographical sketch in Parliament of India website

1916 births
India MPs 1957–1962
India MPs 1962–1967
India MPs 1967–1970
India MPs 1971–1977
Lok Sabha members from Rajasthan
Bharatiya Jana Sangh politicians
1996 deaths